Other Voices, Other Blues is a double album by jazz composer, bandleader and keyboardist Sun Ra and his Quartet recorded in Italy in 1978 and originally released on the Italian Horo label.

Reception
The Allmusic review by Sean Westergaard awarded the album 4 stars stating "This is really a great setting to hear what these guys can do as soloists, with the easy-to-follow changes of the blues and stripped-down ensemble. Luqman Ali's drumming is the anchor, and everyone gets plenty of solo space. Fans of John Gilmore should surely seek this out, but Michael Ray and Sun Ra are also simply fantastic".

Track listing
All compositions by Sun Ra

Side One:
 "Spring and Summer Idyll" – 13:21   
 "One Day in Rome" – 5:24  
Side Two:   
 "Bridge on the Ninth Dimension" – 14:25   
 "Along the Tiber" – 4:04  
Side Three:
 "Sun, Sky and Wind" – 6:30   
 "Rebellion" – 12:17  
Side Four:   
 "Constellation" – 9:15   
 "The Mystery of Being" – 10:20

Personnel
Sun Ra – piano, Crumar Mainman organ, vocals 
John Gilmore – tenor saxophone, percussion vocals
Michael Ray  – trumpet, vocals 
Luqman Ali – drums

References 

Sun Ra albums
Horo Records albums
1978 albums